Rajasthan (lit. 'Land of Kings') is a state in northern India. It is the largest Indian state by area and the seventh largest by population. It is on India's northwestern side, where it comprises most of the wide and inhospitable Thar Desert (also known as the Great Indian Desert) and shares a border with the Pakistani provinces of Punjab to the northwest and Sindh to the west, along the Sutlej-Indus River valley. It is bordered by five other Indian states: Punjab to the north; Haryana and Uttar Pradesh to the northeast; Madhya Pradesh to the southeast; and Gujarat to the southwest. Its geographical location is 23.3 to 30.12 North latitude and 69.30 to 78.17 East longitude, with the Tropic of Cancer passing through its southernmost tip.

Its major features include the ruins of the Indus Valley civilisation at Kalibangan and Balathal, the Dilwara Temples, a Jain pilgrimage site at Rajasthan's only hill station, Mount Abu, in the ancient Aravalli mountain range and eastern Rajasthan, the Keoladeo National Park of Bharatpur, a World Heritage Site known for its bird life. Rajasthan is also home to three national tiger reserves, the Ranthambore National Park in Sawai Madhopur, Sariska Tiger Reserve in Alwar and the Mukundra Hills Tiger Reserve in Kota.

The state was formed on 30 March 1949 when Rajputanathe name adopted by the British Raj for its dependencies in the regionwas merged into the Dominion of India. Its capital and largest city is Jaipur. Other important cities are Jodhpur, Kota, Bikaner, Ajmer, Bharatpur and Udaipur. Rajasthan ranks 29th among Indian states in human development index.

Etymology 
Rajasthan literally means "The Land of Kings" and is a portmanteau of Sanskrit "Rājā" (King) and Sanskrit "Sthāna"(Land) or Persian "St(h)ān" with the same meaning. The oldest reference to Rajasthan is found in a stone inscription dated back to 625 CE. The first printed mention of the name Rajasthan appears in the 1829 publication Annals and Antiquities of Rajasthan or the Central and Western Rajpoot States of India, while the earliest known record of Rajputana as a name for the region is in George Thomas's 1800 memoir Military Memories. John Keay, in his book India: A History, stated that Rajputana was coined by the British in 1829, John Briggs, translating Ferishta's history of early Islamic India, used the phrase "Rajpoot (Rajput) princes" rather than "Indian princes".

History

Ancient 
Parts of what is now Rajasthan were partly part of the Vedic Civilisation and the Indus Valley civilization. Kalibangan, in Hanumangarh district, was a major provincial capital of the Indus Valley Civilization. Another archaeological excavation at the Balathal site in Udaipur district shows a settlement contemporary with the Harrapan civilisation dating back to 3000–1500 BCE.

Stone Age tools dating from 5,000 to 200,000 years were found in Bundi and Bhilwara districts of the state.

The Matsya kingdom of the Vedic civilisation of India is said to roughly corresponded to the former state of Jaipur in Rajasthan and included the whole of Alwar with portions of Bharatpur. The capital of Matsya was at Viratanagar (modern Bairat), which is said to have been named after its founder King Virata.

Bhargava identifies the two districts of Jhunjhunu and Sikar and parts of Jaipur district along with Haryana districts of Mahendragarh and Rewari as part of Vedic state of Brahmavarta. Bhargava also locates the present day Sahibi River as the Vedic Drishadwati River, which along with Saraswati River formed the borders of the Vedic state of Brahmavarta. Manu and Bhrigu narrated the Manusmriti to a congregation of seers in this area. The ashrams of Vedic seers Bhrigu and his son Chayvan Rishi, for whom Chyawanprash was formulated, were near Dhosi Hill, part of which lies in Dhosi village of Jhunjhunu district of Rajasthan and part of which lies in Mahendragarh district of Haryana.

The Western Kshatrapas (405–35 BCE), the Saka rulers of the western part of India, were successors to the Indo-Scythians and were contemporaneous with the Kushans, who ruled the northern part of the Indian subcontinent. The Indo-Scythians invaded the area of Ujjain and established the Saka era (with their calendar), marking the beginning of the long-lived Saka Western Satraps state.

Classical

Gurjara-Pratihara 

The Pratiharas ruled for many dynasties in this part of the country; the region was known as Gurjaratra. Up to the 10th century CE, almost all of North India acknowledged the supremacy of the Imperial Pratiharas, with their seat of power at Kannauj.

The Gurjara Pratihar Empire acted as a barrier for Arab invaders from the 8th to the 11th century. The chief accomplishment of the Gurjara-Pratihara Empire lies in its successful resistance to foreign invasions from the west, starting in the days of Junaid. Historian R. C. Majumdar says that this was openly acknowledged by the Arab writers. He further notes that historians of India have wondered at the slow progress of Muslim invaders in India, as compared with their rapid advance in other parts of the world. Now there seems little doubt that it was the power of the Pratihara army that effectively barred the progress of the Arabs beyond the confines of Sindh, their only conquest for nearly 300 years.

Medieval and Early Modern 

Prithviraj Chauhan defeated the invading Muhammad Ghori in the First Battle of Tarain in 1191. In 1192 CE, Muhammad Ghori decisively defeated Prithviraj at the Second Battle of Tarain. After the defeat of Chauhan in 1192 CE, a part of Rajasthan came under Muslim rulers. The principal centers of their powers were Nagaur and Ajmer. Ranthambhore was also under their suzerainty. At the beginning of the 13th century, the most prominent and powerful state of Rajasthan was Mewar. The Rajputs resisted the Muslim incursions into India, although a number of Rajput kingdoms eventually became subservient to the Delhi Sultanate.
 
The Rajputs put up resistance to the Islamic invasions with their warfare and chivalry for centuries. The Rana's of Mewar led other kingdoms in its resistance to outside rule. Rana Hammir Singh, defeated the Tughlaq dynasty and recovered a large portion of Rajasthan. The indomitable Rana Kumbha defeated the Sultans of Malwa, Nagaur and Gujarat and made Mewar the most powerful Rajput Kingdom in India. The ambitious Rana Sanga united the various Rajput clans and fought against the foreign powers in India. Rana Sanga defeated the Afghan Lodi Empire of Delhi and crushed the Turkic Sultanates of Malwa and Gujarat. Rana Sanga then tried to create an Indian empire but was defeated by the first Mughal Emperor Babur at Khanua. The defeat was due to betrayal by the Tomar King Silhadi of Raisen. After Rana Sanga's death, Marwar rose as a power center in Rajasthan under Rao Maldev Rathore. He conquered Jaisalmer, parts of Gujarat, Jalore, Nagaur, Ajmer, Sanchore, Bhinmal, Radhanpur, Bayana, Tonk, Toda and Nabhara. He expanded the territories of Marwar up to Sindh-Cholistan in west and his northern boundary was just fifty km from Delhi. After defeating Humayun, Sher Shah came towards Rajputana. He defeated Chiefs of Rathore army by trickery in Battle of Sammel and captured some territory of Marwar but it was recovered by Rathores in 1545. After that Rajputana remained mostly free from Islamic occupation till the Akbar's conquest of Rajputana.

Hem Chandra Vikramaditya, the Hindu Emperor, was born in the village of Machheri in Alwar District in 1501. He won 22 battles against Afghans, from Punjab to Bengal including the states of Ajmer and Alwar in Rajasthan, and defeated Akbar's forces twice, first at Agra and then at Delhi in 1556 at Battle of Delhi before acceding to the throne of Delhi and establishing the "Hindu Raj" in North India, albeit for a short duration, from Purana Quila in Delhi. Hem Chandra was killed in the battlefield at Second Battle of Panipat fighting against Mughals on 5 November 1556.

During Akbar's reign most of the Rajput kings accepted Mughal suzerainty, but the rulers of Mewar (Rana Udai Singh II) and Marwar (Rao Chandrasen Rathore) refused to have any form of alliance with the Mughals. To teach the Rajputs a lesson Akbar attacked Udai Singh and killed Rajput commander Jaimal of Chitor and the citizens of Mewar in large numbers. Akbar killed 20,000 – 25,000 unarmed citizens in Chittor on the grounds that they had actively helped in the resistance.

Maharana Pratap took an oath to avenge the citizens of Chittor, he fought the Mughal empire till his death and liberated most of Mewar apart from Chittor itself. Maharana Pratap soon became the most celebrated warrior of Rajasthan and became famous all over India for his sporadic warfare and noble actions. According to Satish Chandra, "Rana Pratap's defiance of the mighty Mughal empire, almost alone and unaided by the other Rajput states, constitutes a glorious saga of Rajput valor and the spirit of self-sacrifice for cherished principles. Rana Pratap's methods of sporadic warfare were later elaborated further by Malik Ambar, the Deccani general, and by Shivaji".

Rana Amar Singh I continued his ancestor's war against the Mughals under Jehangir, he repelled the Mughal armies at Dewar. Later an expedition was again sent under the leadership of Prince Khurram, which caused much damage to life and property of Mewar. Many temples were destroyed, several villages were put on fire and women and children were captured and tortured to make Amar Singh accept surrender.

During Aurangzeb's rule Rana Raj Singh I and Veer Durgadas Rathore were chief among those who defied the intolerant emperor of Delhi. They took advantage of the Aravalli hills and caused heavy damage to the Mughal armies that were trying to occupy Rajasthan.

After Aurangzeb's death Bahadur Shah I tried to subjugate Rajasthan like his ancestors but his plan backfired when the three Rajput Rajas of Amber, Udaipur, and Jodhpur made a joint resistance to the Mughals. The Rajputs first expelled the commandants of Jodhpur and Bayana and recovered Amer by a night attack. They next killed Sayyid Hussain Khan Barha, the commandant of Mewat and many other Mughal officers. Bahadur Shah I, then in the Deccan was forced to patch up a truce with the Rajput Rajas. The Jats, under Suraj Mal, overran the Mughal garrison at Agra and plundered the city taking with them the two great silver doors of the entrance of the famous Taj Mahal which were then melted down by Suraj Mal in 1763.

Over the years, the Mughals began to have internal disputes which greatly distracted them at times. The Mughal Empire continued to weaken, and with the decline of the Mughal Empire in the late 18th century, Rajputana came under the influence of the Marathas. The Maratha Empire, which had replaced the Mughal Empire as the overlord of the subcontinent, was finally replaced by the British Empire in 1818.

In the 19th century, the Rajput kingdoms were exhausted, they had been drained financially and in manpower after continuous wars and due to heavy tributes exacted by the Maratha Empire. To save their kingdoms from instability, rebellions and banditry the Rajput kings concluded treaties with the British in the early 19th century, accepting British suzerainty and control over their external affairs in return for internal autonomy.

Modern 

Modern Rajasthan includes most of Rajputana, which comprises the erstwhile nineteen princely states, three chiefships, and the British district of Ajmer-Merwara. Jaisalmer, Marwar (Jodhpur), Bikaner, Mewar (Chittorgarh), Alwar and Dhundhar (Jaipur) were some of the main Rajput princely states. Bharatpur and Dholpur were Jat princely states whereas Tonk was a princely state under Pathans. The three chiefships were Lawa, Neemrana and Kushalgarh.

Geography 

Mount Abu lies at the southwestern end of the range, separated from the main ranges by the West Banas River, although a series of broken ridges continues into Haryana in the direction of Delhi where it can be seen as outcrops in the form of the Raisina Hill and the ridges farther north. About three-fifths of Rajasthan lies northwest of the Aravallis, leaving two-fifths on the east and south direction.

This range divides the state into 60% in the northwest of the range and 40% in the southeast. The northwest tract is sandy and unproductive with little water but improves gradually from desert land in the far west and northwest to comparatively fertile and habitable land towards the east. The area includes the Thar Desert. The south-eastern area, higher in elevation (100 to 350 m above sea level) and more fertile, has a very diversified topography. In the south lies the hilly tract of Mewar. In the southeast, a large area within the districts of Kota and Bundi forms a tableland. To the northeast of these districts is a rugged region (badlands) following the line of the Chambal River. Farther north the country levels out; the flat plains of the northeastern Bharatpur district are part of an alluvial basin. Merta City lies in the geographical center of Rajasthan.

The Aravalli Range and the lands to the east and southeast of the range are generally more fertile and better watered. This region is home to the Khathiar-Gir dry deciduous forests ecoregion, with tropical dry broadleaf forests that include teak, Acacia, and other trees. The hilly Vagad region, home to the cities of Dungarpur, Pratapgarh, and Banswara lies in southernmost Rajasthan, on the border with Gujarat and Madhya Pradesh. With the exception of Mount Abu, Vagad is the wettest region in Rajasthan, and the most heavily forested. North of Vagad lies the Mewar region, home to the cities of Udaipur and Chittaurgarh. The Hadoti region lies to the southeast, on the border with Madhya Pradesh. North of Hadoti and Mewar lies the Dhundhar region, home to the state capital of Jaipur. Mewat, the easternmost region of Rajasthan, borders Haryana and Uttar Pradesh. Eastern and southeastern Rajasthan is drained by the Banas and Chambal rivers, tributaries of the Ganges.

The northwestern portion of Rajasthan is generally sandy and dry. Most of this region is covered by the Thar Desert which extends into adjoining portions of Pakistan. The Aravalli Range does not intercept the moisture-giving southwest monsoon winds off the Arabian Sea, as it lies in a direction parallel to that of the coming monsoon winds, leaving the northwestern region in a rain shadow. The Thar Desert is thinly populated; the City of Jodhpur is the largest city in the desert and a major metropolitan area of India which is known as the gateway of the Thar desert. The desert has some major districts like Jodhpur, Jaisalmer, Barmer, Bikaner, and Nagaur. This area is also important from a defence point of view. Jodhpur airbase is one of the largest airbases in India, BSF and Military bases are also situated here. Currently four civil airports are located here: Jodhpur, Jaisalmer, Bikaner and Nagaur, of which Jodhpur is the major civil airport, being the 44th busiest airport in India and one of the oldest air strips of India, being built in the 1920s.

The Northwestern thorn scrub forests lie in a band around the Thar Desert, between the desert and the Aravallis. This region receives less than 400  mm of rain annually. Temperatures can sometimes exceed 45 °C in the summer months and drop below freezing point in the winter. The Godwar, Marwar, and Shekhawati regions lie in the thorn scrub forest zone, along with the city of Jodhpur. The Luni River and its tributaries are the major river system of Godwar and Marwar regions, draining the western slopes of the Aravallis and emptying southwest into the great Rann of Kutch wetland in neighbouring Gujarat. This river is saline in the lower reaches and remains potable only up to Balotara in Barmer district. The Ghaggar River, which originates in Haryana, is an intermittent stream that disappears into the sands of the Thar Desert in the northern corner of the state and is seen as a remnant of the primitive Sarasvati river.

Flora and fauna 

Seashells and massive fossilised tree trunks in this park record the geological history of the desert. The region is a haven for migratory and resident birds of the desert. One can see many eagles, harriers, falcons, buzzards, kestrels and vultures. Short-toed snake eagles (Circaetus gallicus), tawny eagles (Aquila rapax), spotted eagles (Aquila clanga), laggar falcons (Falco jugger) and kestrels are the commonest of these.

The Ranthambore National Park located in Sawai Madhopur, one of the well known tiger reserves in the country, became a part of Project Tiger in 1973.

Tal Chhapar Sanctuary is a very small sanctuary in Sujangarh, Churu District,  from Jaipur in the Shekhawati region. This sanctuary is home to a large population of blackbuck. Desert foxes and the caracal, an apex predator, also known as the desert lynx, can also be spotted, along with birds such as the partridge, harriers, eastern imperial eagle, pale harrier, marsh harrier, short-toed eagle, tawny eagle, sparrow hawk, crested lark, demoiselle crane, skylarks, green bee-eater, brown dove, black ibis and sand grouse. The great Indian bustard, known locally as the godavan, and which is a state bird, has been classed as critically endangered since 2011.

Wildlife protection 

Rajasthan is also noted for its national parks and wildlife sanctuaries. There are four national parks and wildlife sanctuaries: Keoladeo National Park of Bharatpur, Sariska Tiger Reserve of Alwar, Ranthambore National Park of Sawai Madhopur, and Desert National Park of Jaisalmer. A national-level institute, Arid Forest Research Institute (AFRI) an autonomous institute of the ministry of forestry is situated in Jodhpur and continuously works on desert flora and their conservation.

Ranthambore National Park is 7 km from Sawai Madhopur Railway Station. It is known worldwide for its tiger population and is considered by both wilderness lovers and photographers as one of the best places in India to spot tigers. At one point, due to poaching and negligence, tigers became extinct at Sariska, but five tigers have been relocated there. Prominent among the wildlife sanctuaries are Mount Abu Sanctuary, Bhensrod Garh Sanctuary, Darrah Sanctuary, Jaisamand Sanctuary, Kumbhalgarh Wildlife Sanctuary, Jawahar Sagar Sanctuary, and Sita Mata Wildlife Sanctuary.

Communication 
Major internet service provider (ISP) and telecom companies are present in Rajasthan including Airtel, Data Infosys Limited, Reliance Limited, Idea, Jio, RailTel Corporation of India, Software Technology Parks of India (STPI), Tata Telecom and Vodafone. Data Infosys was the first ISP to bring the internet to Rajasthan in April 1999 and OASIS was the first private mobile telephone company. Today the largest coverage area and the clientele are with BSNL.

Government and politics 

The politics of Rajasthan are dominated mainly by the Bharatiya Janata Party and the Indian National Congress.

Administrative divisions 

Rajasthan is divided into 33 districts within seven divisions:

Economy 

Rajasthan's economy is primarily agricultural and pastoral. Wheat and barley are cultivated over large areas, as are pulses, sugarcane, and oilseeds. Cotton and tobacco are the state's cash crops. Rajasthan is among the largest producers of edible oils in India and the second-largest producer of oilseeds. Rajasthan is also the biggest wool-producing state in India and the main opium producer and consumer. There are mainly two crop seasons. The water for irrigation comes from wells and tanks. The Indira Gandhi Canal irrigates northwestern Rajasthan.

The main industries are mineral based, agriculture-based, and textile based. Rajasthan is the second-largest producer of polyester fibre in India. Several prominent chemical and engineering companies are located in the city of Kota, in southern Rajasthan. Rajasthan is pre-eminent in quarrying and mining in India. The Taj Mahal was built from white marble which was mined from a town called Makrana. The state is the second-largest source of cement in India. It has rich salt deposits at Sambhar, copper mines at Khetri, Jhunjhunu, and zinc mines at Dariba, Zawar mines and Rampura Agucha (opencast) near Bhilwara. Dimensional stone mining is also undertaken in Rajasthan. Jodhpur sandstone is mostly used in monuments, important buildings, and residential buildings. This stone is termed as Chittar Patthar. Jodhpur leads in the handicraft and guar gum industries.
Rajasthan is also a part of the Mumbai-Delhi Industrial corridor set to benefit economically. The state gets 39% of the DMIC, with major districts of Jaipur, Alwar, Kota and Bhilwara benefiting.

Rajasthan also has reserves of low-silica limestone.

Rajasthan connected 100% of its population to electricity power in 2019 (raising the rate of electricity access from 71% of the population in 2015). The renewable energy sector plays the most important role in the increase of generation capacities, with the main focus on solar energy. In 2020, Bhadla Solar Park was recognised as the largest cluster of photovoltaic power plants in a single region in the world, with the installed power exceeding the 2.2 gigawatt peak.

Transport 

Rajasthan is connected by many national highways, the most renowned being NH 8, which is India's first 4–8 lane highway. Rajasthan also has an inter-city surface transport system both in terms of railways and bus network. All chief cities are connected by air, rail, and road.

Air 
There are six main airports at Rajasthan – Jaipur International Airport, Jodhpur Airport, Udaipur Airport and the recently started Ajmer Airport, Bikaner Airport and Jaisalmer Airport. These airports connect Rajasthan with the major cities of India such as Delhi and Mumbai. There is another airport in Kota but it is not open for commercial/civilian flights yet.

Rail 
Rajasthan is connected with the main cities of India by rail. Jaipur, Kota, Ajmer, Jodhpur, Bharatpur, Bikaner, Alwar, Abu Road, and Udaipur are the principal railway stations in Rajasthan. Kota City is the only electrified section served by three Rajdhani Expresses and trains to all major cities of India. There is also an international railway, the Thar Express from Jodhpur (India) to Karachi (Pakistan). However, this is not open to foreign nationals.

Road 
Rajasthan is well-connected to the main cities of the country including Delhi, Ahmedabad and Indore by state and national highways and served by Rajasthan State Road Transport Corporation (RSRTC) and private operators. Now in March 2017, 75 per cent of all national highways are being built in Rajasthan according to the public works minister of Rajasthan.

Demographics 

According to the 2011 Census of India, Rajasthan has a total population of 68,548,437. The native Rajasthani people make up the majority of the state's population. The state of Rajasthan is also populated by Sindhis, who came to Rajasthan from Sindh province (now in Pakistan) during the India-Pakistan separation in 1947. As for religion, Rajasthan's residents are mainly Hindus, who account for 88.49% of the population. Muslims make up 9.07%, Sikhs 1.27% and Jains 0.91% of the population.

Brahmins, according to Outlook constituted 8% to 10% of the population of Rajasthan as per a 2003 report, but only 7% in a 2007 report. According to a 2007 DNA India report, 12.5% of the state are Brahmins. According to a report by Moneycontrol.com at the time of 2018 Rajasthan Legislative Assembly election, the Scheduled Caste (SC) population was 18%, Scheduled Tribe (ST) was 13%, Jats 12%, Gurjars and Rajputs 9% each, Brahmins and Meenas 7% each. A Hindustan Times report from 2019 also agrees to the total ST population of 13%, of which Meenas constitute the biggest group at 7%. According to a Deutsche Welle report, the Jats constitute 12–15% of the population of Rajasthan, followed by Meenas with 10% and Gurjars with 6%. While as per a 2007 BBC Hindi report, Meenas were 14% and Gurjars were 4% of the state's population.

Language 

Hindi is the official language of the state, while English is the additional official language.

The languages of Rajasthan primarily belong to the Rajasthani group of Indo-Aryan languages, which most people regard as their own language. In the north are dialects of Punjabi and Bagri, which is a transition between Rajasthani and Punjabi. In the northeast is spoken Shekhawati and Dhundari which gradually merge with Haryanvi. In the east is spoken Mewati in the Mewat region, while in the far east is spoken Braj. To the southeast is spoken Haryanvi. To the west in the heart of the Thar Desert is spoken Marwari, which merges to Gujarati in the southwest. In the south, in the Mewar region, is spoken Mewari, while in the hills of Wagad is spoken Wagdi, a Bhil language. Many speakers of Rajasthani languages refer to their language as Hindi, and Standard Hindi is the medium of education and is common in cities. Urdu is also common in cities although the vast majority of Muslims speak one of the Rajasthani languages as their first language. Sindhi is also common in the cities and along the border with Sindh in Pakistan where Dhatki, a transition between Marwari and Sindhi, is the main dialect on both sides of the border.

The languages taught under the three-language formula are:

First language: Hindi

Second language: English

Third language: Gujarati, Punjabi, Sanskrit, Sindhi or Urdu

Culture

Food 

Rajasthani cooking was influenced by both the war-like lifestyles of its inhabitants and the availability of ingredients in this arid region. Food that could last for several days and could be eaten without heating was preferred. Thus, pickles of Rajasthan are quite famous for their tangy and spicy flavour. The Panchkuta delicacy is also a famous one – meaning 5 vegetables – a dish that lasts for several days, and is made out of certain weed plants that only grow in the wild desert. The scarcity of water and fresh green vegetables have all had their effect on cooking. It is known for its snacks like Bikaneri Bhujia. Other famous dishes include bajre ki roti (millet bread) and lahsun ki chutney (hot garlic paste), mawa kachori Mirchi Bada, Pyaaj Kachori and ghevar from Jodhpur, Alwar ka Mawa (milk cake), Kadhi kachori from Ajmer, Malpua from Pushkar, Daal kachori (Kota kachori) from Kota and rassgullas from Bikaner. Originating from the Marwar region of the state is the concept of Marwari Bhojnalaya or vegetarian restaurants, today found in many parts of India, which offer vegetarian food popular among Marwari people. Ghee is an essential ingredient in most Rajasthani cuisines, and dollops of ghee are poured over food as a welcoming gesture for guests. Dal-baati-churma is very popular in Rajasthan. The traditional way to serve it is to first coarsely mash the baati, and then pour pure ghee on top of it. It is served with daal (lentils) and spicy garlic chutney; it is also served with besan (gram flour) ki kadi. It is commonly served at all festivities, including religious occasions, wedding ceremonies, and birthday parties in Rajasthan.

Music and Dance 
The Ghoomar dance from Jaipur, Jodhpur, and Kalbelia of the Kalbelia tribe has gained international recognition. Folk music is a large part of the Rajasthani culture. The Manganiyar and Langa communities from Rajasthan are notable for their folk music. Kathputli, Bhopa, Chang, Teratali, Ghindr, Gair dance, Kachchhi Ghori, and Tejaji are examples of traditional Rajasthani culture. Folk songs are commonly ballads that relate heroic deeds and love stories; and religious or devotional songs known as bhajans and banis which are often accompanied by musical instruments like dholak, sitar, and sarangi are also sung.

Art 
Rajasthan is known for its traditional, colourful art. The block prints, tie and dye prints, gota patti (main), Bagaru prints, Sanganer prints, and Zari embroidery are major export products from Rajasthan. Handicraft items like wooden furniture and crafts, carpets, and blue pottery are commonly found here. Shopping reflects the colourful culture, Rajasthani clothes have a lot of mirror work and embroidery. A traditional Rajasthani dress for females comprises an ankle-length skirt and a short top, known as chaniya choli Mainly pure owned by traditional people. A piece of cloth is used to cover the head, both for protection from heat and maintenance of modesty. Rajasthani dresses are usually designed in bright colours like blue, yellow, and orange.

Education 

In recent years, Rajasthan has worked on improving education. The state government has been making sustained efforts to raise the education standard.

Literacy 
In recent decades the literacy rate of Rajasthan has increased significantly. In 1991, the state's literacy rate was only 38.55% (54.99% male and 20.44% female). In 2001, the literacy rate increased to 60.41% (75.70% male and 43.85% female). This was the highest leap in the percentage of literacy recorded in India (the rise in female literacy being 23%). At the Census 2011, Rajasthan had a literacy rate of 67.06% (80.51% male and 52.66% female). Although Rajasthan's literacy rate is below the national average of 74.04% and although its female literacy rate is the lowest in the country, the state has been praised for its efforts and achievements in raising literacy rates.

In rural areas of Rajasthan, the literacy rate is 76.16% for males and 45.8% for females. This has been debated across all the party levels, when the governor of Rajasthan set a minimum educational qualification for the village panchayat elections.

Tourism 

Rajasthan attracted a total of 45.9 million domestic and 1.6 million foreign tourists in 2017, which is the tenth highest in terms of domestic visitors and fifth highest in foreign tourists. The tourism industry in Rajasthan is growing effectively each year and is becoming one of the major income sources for the state government. Rajasthan is home to many attractions for domestic and foreign travellers, including the forts and palaces of Jaipur, the lakes of Udaipur, the temples of Rajsamand and Pali, sand dunes of Jaisalmer and Bikaner, Havelis of Mandawa and Fatehpur, the wildlife of Sawai Madhopur, the scenic beauty of Mount Abu, the tribes of Dungarpur and Banswara, and the cattle fair of Pushkar.

Rajasthan is known for its customs, culture, colours, majestic forts, and palaces, folk dances and music, local festivals, local food, sand dunes, carved temples and beautiful Havelis. Rajasthan's Jaipur Jantar Mantar, Mehrangarh Fort and Stepwell of Jodhpur, Dilwara Temples, Chittor Fort, Lake Palace, miniature paintings in Bundi, and numerous city palaces and Havelis are part of the architectural heritage of India. Jaipur, the Pink City, is noted for the ancient houses made of a type of sandstone dominated by a pink hue. In Jodhpur, most houses are painted blue. At Ajmer, there is white marble Bara-dari on the Anasagar lake and Soniji Ki Nasiyan. Jain Temples dot Rajasthan from north to south and east to west. Dilwara Temples of Mount Abu, Shrinathji Temple of Nathdwara, Ranakpur Jain temple dedicated to Lord Adinath in Pali District, Jain temples in the fort complexes of Chittor, Jaisalmer and Kumbhalgarh, Lodurva Jain temples, Mirpur Jain Temple of Sirohi, Sarun Mata Temple at Kotputli, Bhandasar and Karni Mata Temple of Bikaner and Mandore of Jodhpur are some of the best examples. Keoladeo National Park, Ranthambore National Park, Sariska Tiger Reserve, Tal Chhapar Sanctuary, are wildlife attractions of Rajasthan. Mewar festival of Udaipur, Teej festival and Gangaur festival in Jaipur, Desert festival of Jodhpur, Brij Holi of Bharatpur, Matsya festival of Alwar, Kite festival of Jodhpur, Kolayat fair in Bikaner are some of the most popular fairs and festivals of Rajasthan.

See also 

 Jatan Sansthan (2001)
 List of people from Rajasthan
 Outline of Rajasthan

References

Further reading 
 Bhattacharya, Manoshi. 2008. The Royal Rajputs: Strange Tales and Stranger Truths. Rupa & Co, New Delhi.
 Gahlot, Sukhvirsingh. 1992. RAJASTHAN: Historical & Cultural. J. S. Gahlot Research Institute, Jodhpur.
 Somani, Ram Vallabh. 1993. History of Rajasthan. Jain Pustak Mandir, Jaipur.
 Tod, James & Crooke, William. 1829. Annals and Antiquities of Rajasthan or the Central and Western Rajpoot States of India,. Numerous reprints, including 3 Vols. Reprint: Low Price Publications, Delhi. 1990.  (set of 3 vols.)
 Mathur, P.C., 1995. Social and Economic Dynamics of Rajasthan Politics (Jaipur, Aaalekh)

External links

Government
 Official Site of the Government of Rajasthan, India
 Official Tourism Site of Rajasthan, India

General information
 
 

 

States and union territories of India
States and territories established in 1950
1950 establishments in India